Psy (Dogs), known in English as Pigs, is a 1992 Polish crime thriller directed by Władysław Pasikowski. The film was released on 20 November 1992. Two sequels have followed, 1994's Pigs 2: The Last Blood and 2020's Pigs 3.

Plot

Poland in 1990, right after the fall of communism, former officers of the SB (Poland's communist secret police) are undergoing re-evaluation, in the process of which the country's new democratic leadership is trying to establish whether or not they can be incorporated into the new police service. Franciszek Maurer (Franz) is one of them. He has a notorious service record and is ruthless, but devoted to service - the only thing he cares about, since he became estranged from his wife and son. Eventually he is taken over by the new police force, while one of his best friends, Olgierd Żwirski (Olo), is not. Facing unemployment, Olo joins a newly formed criminal gang, consisting mainly of ex-SB agents, which operates in international narcotics trade. Franz and Olo, who try to co-operate despite the new circumstances, soon face each other as enemies. Moreover, Franz's relationship with Angela Wenz, a young girl he has befriended, becomes more and more complicated as the story continues, especially after Angela meets Olo.

Background

Polish cinema went through a relatively quick and much-needed transition in the late 1980s that mirrored political changes. As Poland became a democratic country, the state abandoned its monopoly of the film industry and censorship was lifted. This not only gave freedom to Polish film makers, but also allowed foreign movies to be screened. This new regulatory policy was well-received among new audiences who were too young to have a personal memory of the Solidarity movement and became tired of watching movies about it.  In a new market economy for films, audiences started to choose what they wanted to watch. This meant that classic Polish films struggled to capture audiences, as foreign Hollywood-like movies gained popularity. While some feared the end of Polish cinema, others saw it as a chance to catch up. It is through the action-packed screening of a very contemporary Polish story that Psy took up controversial and previously restricted topics. Issues of political instability with a lack of a true national hero are raised. Inequality and corruption, ranging from a social to a personal level are also treated. Finally, large-scale criminal activity in the immediate post-communist period is highlighted, presented through formerly taboo sub-topics of violence, vulgar language and drugs.

Cast

References

External links

 
 Pigs - Władysław Pasikowski at Culture.pl
https://link.springer.com/chapter/10.1007%2F978-3-319-66496-5_16

1992 films
1990s Polish-language films
Polish crime thriller films
1992 crime thriller films
Films directed by Wladyslaw Pasikowski
Films set in Poland
Films set in 1999